Petr Velička (born 26 February 1967 in Frýdek-Místek) is a Czech chess grandmaster.

He was awarded the GM title in 2007. His best placing in the Czech Chess Championship was a second place in 1999 in Lázně Bohdaneč.

References

External links 
 

Czech chess players
Chess grandmasters
Living people
1967 births
People from Frýdek-Místek